Shoujocon was an American fan convention for anime and manga which focused on the shōjo (girls') subgenre. Founded in 2000 by women identified as "Nora" and "Katchan", and initially financed through eBay sales of fan-donated merchandise, Shoujocon quickly grew from 456 attendees to a peak of 1,252. In addition to its unique audience, Shoujocon attempted many other organizational and programmatic innovations during its time, such as an international staff which held meetings entirely online, support for doujinshi artists and writers, and cultural workshops.

In 2002, Nora and Katchan stepped down, turning leadership over to the newly formed Shoujo Arts Society (SAS), a non-profit organization incorporated to manage Shoujocon and promote the shōjo subgenre via other events. For the 2003 convention, Shoujocon moved to Rye, New York, where difficulties with the hotel and the change of location triggered a severe drop in attendance and poor reviews of the convention. The 2004 convention was first postponed, then canceled altogether.

Working with the organizers of Yuricon, the Shoujo Arts Society later announced a joint event called "Onna!" which was held in October 2005.

History

Event history

References

Defunct anime conventions
Defunct comics conventions
Defunct multigenre conventions
Recurring events established in 2000
Recurring events disestablished in 2003
Shōjo manga
Conventions in New Jersey